Donald is a city in Marion County, Oregon, United States. The population was 1,009 at the 2020 census. It is part of the Salem Metropolitan Statistical Area.

Geography
Donald is located along the route of the Oregon Electric Railway.

Demographics

2010 census
As of the census of 2010, there were 979 people, 347 households, and 281 families living in the city. The racial makeup of the city was 88.3% White, 0.6% African American, 0.3% Native American, 0.5% Asian, 0.3% Pacific Islander, 6.1% from other races, and 3.9% from two or more races. Hispanic or Latino of any race were 14.6% of the population.

There were 347 households, of which 35.2% had children under the age of 18 living with them, 64.3% were married couples living together, 10.1% had a female householder with no husband present, 6.6% had a male householder with no wife present, and 19.0% were non-families. 14.7% of all households were made up of individuals, and 4.3% had someone living alone who was 65 years of age or older. The average household size was 2.82 and the average family size was 3.06.

The median age in the city was 38.9 years. 23.6% of residents were under the age of 18; 8% were between the ages of 18 and 24; 26.7% were from 25 to 44; 31.9% were from 45 to 64; and 9.7% were 65 years of age or older. The gender makeup of the city was 50.2% male and 49.8% female.

2000 census
As of the census of 2000, there were 608 people, 202 households, and 163 families living in the city. The population density was 2,737.9 people per square mile (1,067.0/km2). There were 236 housing units at an average density of 1,062.7 per square mile (414.2/km2). The racial makeup of the city was 89.14% White, 0.16% African American, 1.48% Native American, 0.33% Asian, 0.16% Pacific Islander, 6.91% from other races, and 1.81% from two or more races. Hispanic or Latino of any race were 11.18% of the population.

There were 202 households, out of which 43.6% had children under the age of 18 living with them, 68.8% were married couples living together, 7.9% had a female householder with no husband present, and 19.3% were non-families. 12.9% of all households were made up of individuals, and 2.0% had someone living alone who was 65 years of age or older. The average household size was 3.01 and the average family size was 3.34.

In the city, the population was spread out, with 31.3% under the age of 18, 7.2% from 18 to 24, 35.5% from 25 to 44, 20.4% from 45 to 64, and 5.6% who were 65 years of age or older. The median age was 31 years. For every 100 females, there were 117.1 males. For every 100 females age 18 and over, there were 113.3 males.

The median income for a household in the city was $45,208, and the median income for a family was $50,227. Males had a median income of $31,696 versus $30,078 for females. The per capita income for the city was $16,752. About 6.3% of families and 6.9% of the population were below the poverty line, including 12.0% of those under age 18 and none of those age 65 or over.

Education
Donald sends its students to North Marion School District, including to North Marion High School.

References

External links
 Entry for Donald in the Oregon Blue Book
 Official website

Cities in Oregon
Cities in Marion County, Oregon
Salem, Oregon metropolitan area
1912 establishments in Oregon